George London may refer to:
George London (bass-baritone) (1920–1985), American operatic bass-baritone
George London (landscape architect) (died 1714), English nurseryman and garden designer
Sir George Ernest London, of the Newfoundland Commission of Government